Scorched Earth is a 1969 Norwegian drama film directed by Knut Andersen. It was entered into the 6th Moscow International Film Festival where it won a diploma.

Cast
 Rolf Søder as Hekki Haldonen
 Anne-Lise Tangstad as Alma, Heikkis kone
 Kåre Tannvik as Ivar
 Tove Andreassen as Anne
 Brith Henriksen as Lilly
 Bonne Gauguin as Bestemoren
 Solfrid Heier as Herdis
 Arne Lindtner Næss as Ilja
 Reiner Brönneke as Offiseren
 Bernt Erik Larssen as Adjutanten
 Dagmar Myhrvold as Herdis' bestemor
 Egil Hjorth-Jenssen as Herdis' bestefar

References

External links
 

1969 films
1969 drama films
1960s Norwegian-language films
Norwegian drama films
Films directed by Knut Andersen